Beeville Independent School District is a public school district based in Beeville, Texas (USA). Beeville serves central Bee County, including the city of Beeville and the unincorporated community of Blue Berry Hill.

Finances
As of the 2018–2019 school year, the appraised valuation of property in the district was $744,700,000. The maintenance tax rate was $1.17 and the bond tax rate was $0.0354 per $100 of appraised valuation.

Academic achievement
In 2017, the school district was rated "Met Standard" by the Texas Education Agency.

Schools
In the 2018–2019 school year, the district has seven schools open.
A. C. Jones High School (Grades 9-12)
Health Professions Magnet Academy (Grades 9-12)
Moreno Junior High School (Grades 6-8)
The Joe Barnhart Magnet Academy (Grades 6-8) 
Fadden–McKeown–Chambliss Elementary School (Grades 1-5)
R. A. Hall Elementary School (Grades 1-5)
Hampton–Moreno–Dugat Early Childhood Center (EE-KG)

See also

List of school districts in Texas

References

External links
 

School districts in Bee County, Texas